Mathabhanga College(Bengali: মাথাভাঙ্গা কলেজ) established in 1969, is one of the oldest college in Mathabhanga. It offers undergraduate courses in arts, commerce and sciences. The campus is in the Cooch Behar district. It is affiliated to  Cooch Behar Panchanan Barma University.

Departments

Science

Chemistry
Physics
Mathematics

Arts and Commerce

Bengali
English
Sanskrit
History
Political Science
Philosophy
Economics
Commerce

Accreditation
The college is recognized by the University Grants Commission (UGC).

See also

References

External links
Mathabhanga College

Colleges affiliated to Cooch Behar Panchanan Barma University
Academic institutions formerly affiliated with the University of North Bengal
Educational institutions established in 1969
Universities and colleges in Cooch Behar district
1969 establishments in West Bengal